Mystropetalon is a genus of flowering plants belonging to the family Balanophoraceae.

Its native range is South Africa.

Species
Species:
 Mystropetalon thomii Harv.

References

Balanophoraceae
Santalales genera